Commissioners of Police (also known as Police Commissioners) in India are IPS officers who head the police force in a police commissionerate. A police commissionerate can combine several adjoining districts under it. A Police Commissioner holds higher executive powers than those available to a Superintendent of Police (SP) or Senior SP (SSP) as in-charge of the police force of a district. Commissioner of Police (CP) is a post that can be held by an IPS officer of the rank SP and above, depending upon the sanction provided by the respective state government (or in case of Delhi, by the Government of India).

History and description
Traditionally at the district level, the Superintendent of Police (SP) or Senior SP (SSP) maintains law and order by working with the District Magistrate (DM). Under the Commissioners of Police (CP) system, the magisterial powers of DM are given to the CP and to sanctioned police officers under him/her (e.g., Special/Joint/Additional/Deputy/Assistant CP). For large metropolitan cities, the CP system is generally considered more suitable policing system.

Commissionerates 
A Police Commissionerate's jurisdiction can consist of several adjoining districts. The Hyderabad City Police commissionerate since 1847 AD, established in the erstwhile Hyderabad State by the Nizams is an oldest police commissionerate in India. The British India government brought the CP system first to Kolkata and Chennai in 1856, and followed it in Mumbai in 1864.

Commissioners of Police 
Commissioners of Police in India are IPS officers who head the police force in a commissionerate. They hold higher executive powers than those available to a Superintendent of Police (SP) or Senior SP (SSP) as in-charge of the police force of a district. Commissioner of Police (CP) is a post that can be held by an IPS officer of the rank SP and above, depending upon the sanction provided by the respective state government (or in case of Delhi, by the Government of India).

List of Commissioners of Police
Following is the list of Commissioners of Police (CP) in India, along with their respective ranks (these ranks can vary from time to time):-

Andhra Pradesh Police

Assam Police

Delhi Police

Gujarat Police

Haryana Police

Karnataka Police

Kerala Police

Madhya Pradesh Police

Maharashtra Police

Nagaland Police

Odisha Police

Punjab Police

Rajasthan Police

Tamil Nadu Police

Telangana Police

Uttar Pradesh Police

West Bengal Police

States and UTs without CP
The following police forces in India do not have Police Commissionerate system:-

States
 Arunachal Pradesh Police
 Bihar Police
 Chhattisgarh Police
 Goa Police
 Himachal Pradesh Police
 Jharkhand Police
 Manipur Police
 Meghalaya Police
 Mizoram Police
 Sikkim Police
 Tripura Police
 Uttarakhand Police

Among the 10 most populous states of India, only Bihar (3rd most populous) does not have CP system in any of its cities.

Union Territories
 Andaman and Nicobar Islands Police 
 Chandigarh Police
 Dadra and Nagar Haveli and Daman and Diu Police
 Jammu and Kashmir Police
 Ladakh Police
 Lakshadweep Police
 Puducherry Police

Largest cities without CP
Among the Indian cities having population above 1.5 million (2011 Census), the only city which does not have CP system is Patna.

Notes

See also
 Director General of Police
 District Magistrate
 Divisional Commissioner
 Law enforcement in India
 Municipal Commissioner
 Police forces of India
 Police ranks and insignia of India

References

External links 
 Difference between Commissioner of Police (CP) and Director General of Police (DGP) in India | Commissioner vs Director General of Police (DGP) Comparison - Difference between Commissioner of Police and DGP (Director General of Police)

Law enforcement in India
Police ranks